AlliedSignal was an American aerospace, automotive and engineering company created through the 1985 merger of Allied Corp. and The Signal Companies. It subsequently purchased Honeywell for $14.8 billion in 1999, and thereafter adopted the Honeywell name and identity.

AlliedSignal was a member of the Dow Jones Industrial Average from 1985 until February 19, 2008.

History
The Allied Chemical & Dye Corporation originated with the 1920 merger of five chemical companies: Barrett Paving Materials (est. 1852), General Chemical Company (est. 1899), National Aniline & Chemical Company (est. 1917), Semet-Solvay Company (est. 1895), and the Solvay Process Company (est. 1881).  The consolidation occurred with the backing of chemist William Nichols, who became concerned about dependence on the German chemical industry during World War I, and financier Eugene Meyer. It acquired the Eltra Corporation in 1979.

The company renamed itself the Allied Chemical Corporation in 1958, then simply the Allied Corp. in 1981. Allied merged with the Bendix Corporation in 1983, beginning the company's involvement in aerospace.

The Signal Companies traced their history to the Signal Gasoline Company, founded by Samuel B. Mosher in 1922. It renamed itself to Signal Gas & Oil in 1928 to reflect its expanding businesses; by the 1950s, Signal was the largest independent oil company on the West Coast of the United States and Mosher held large stakes in American President Lines and Flying Tiger Line. In 1964, Signal merged with the Garrett Corporation, an aerospace company, and the combined company adopted "The Signal Companies" as its corporate name in 1968.

The merger of Allied and Signal made aerospace the new company's largest business sector. The combined company adopted the name Allied-Signal on September 19, 1985. It dropped the hyphen to become AlliedSignal in 1993 to reinforce a one-company image and signify the full integration of all of its businesses. On June 7, 1999 AlliedSignal acquired Honeywell for $14.8 billion and took its more recognizable name.

Product range
Before the merger, Honeywell was an international controls company that developed and supplied advanced technology products, systems and services to aviation and space companies and industry. The product lines of the two companies were complementary, the only principal overlap being avionics.

Aerospace
Aircraft lighting
Aircraft wheels & braking systems
Auxiliary power units (APUs)
Avionics
Engines for regional/business aircraft
Environmental control systems (ECS)
Flight recorders (Black boxes)
Jet engine fuel control systems
Automotive products
Autolite - Spark plugs
Fram - Air filters, fuel filters, oil filters
Prestone - Antifreeze
Garrett - Turbochargers (formerly AiResearch)
Engineered materials
Electronic products
Polymers
Specialised chemicals
Federal Manufacturing and Technology
Operates facilities for the United States Department of Energy

As of 2006, Allied-Signal's automotive products included Fram Filters, Autolite Spark Plugs and Prestone Anti-Freeze. The Bendix Corporation had purchased both the Fram and Autolite brands from other companies in 1973. The Prestone brand was acquired in the late 1990s.

See also
Garrett AiResearch

References

External links
 Globalfinancialdata.com: exact dates for name changes, as listed on the Dow Jones Industrial Average

.
Defunct engineering companies of the United States
Chemical companies of the United States
Electronics companies of the United States
Auto parts suppliers of the United States
Instrument-making corporations
American companies established in 1985
Electronics companies established in 1985
Manufacturing companies established in 1985
Technology companies established in 1985
Manufacturing companies disestablished in 1999
Technology companies disestablished in 1999
1985 establishments in New Jersey
1999 disestablishments in New Jersey
Companies formerly listed on the New York Stock Exchange
Former components of the Dow Jones Industrial Average
1999 mergers and acquisitions
American companies disestablished in 1999
Defunct manufacturing companies based in New Jersey
Bendix Corporation